On 30 November 1986 at 02:19 local time, an earthquake with a moment magnitude of 5.1 struck right near João Câmara. It was widely felt in Rio Grande do Norte, the most seismically active area of Brazil. It resulted in heavy damage to buildings in the town of João Câmara, displacing thousands. Usually referred to as the 1986 João Câmara earthquake (or Sismo de João Câmara de 1986 in Portuguese), it is widely remembered as one of the most significant events in the country's history.

The mainshock was preceded by a series of foreshocks that began in August, and was followed by a series of aftershocks which continued until 1990.

Tectonic setting 

Brazil is geologically dominated by 3 major sedimentary basins; the Amazon, Paraná and Parnaíba basins. These basins of Paleozoic-Mesozoic age are the drainage systems of the South American continent. The rest of the country consists of metamorphic rocks of the Brazilian Shield, a geologic province which consists of 4 cratons of Archean to Mesoproterozoic age. These cratons are connected by Neoproterozoic collisions which formed the Brasiliano orogeny. The Brasiliano orogeny can be found on the east and northeastern coast of Brazil. Also in this region can be found some remnant aulacogens and rifts from the South America-Africa breakup period.

In the region where the earthquake sequence took place, in Rio Grande do Norte, can be found the Borborema Province, which is a structurally complex wide exposure of Precambrian rocks that cover an area of roughly 400,000 km2 in northeastern Brazil. The province consists of a basement made of Archean-Paleoproterozoic gneiss and other types of metamorphic rocks. This basement is covered by Meso-Neoproterozoic rocks which were heavily deformed during the formation of the Pan-African orogeny roughly 600 million years ago. The Borborema Province consists of 5 sub-provinces which are separated by shear zones which vary in scale.

More specifically, the swarm of earthquakes including the 5.1 can be found in the Rio Grande do Norte sub-province, which is a crustal block of Rhyacian to Orosirian age. To the south of the block can be found the Patos Lineament to the south and the Senador Pompeu Shear Zone to the west. The block was made as a result of development and deformation of the Brasiliano Shear Zone.

Earthquake 

The  5.1 earthquake which occurred near João Câmara, a town with a population of 22,000 at the time was the part of an earthquake swarm which started with a  3.3 magnitude earthquake on 5 August 1986. Three events larger than 4.0 followed in the next month with aftershocks until the larger 5.1 earthquake struck in the early hours of 30 November 1986.

In the region's history, the last seismic activity had occurred in 1952 and 1983 which was also a small sequence of earthquakes. 6 years earlier, a  5.2 earthquake had also struck nearby, in Ceará; hence why the northeast of Brazil is considered to be the most seismically active portion of the country.

Characteristics 
The fault plane solutions for the earthquake and the other events have a mutual agreement which indicates southwest–northeast directed strike-slip faulting with a slight normal component in a linear manner along the Samambaia Fault.

Sequence 
The earthquake sequence started on 5 August 1986, when a magnitude 3.3 earthquake was strongly felt in João Câmara. This, in the next days was followed by multiple 3.0+ quakes until 11 September, with the largest quake being a  4.2. The sequence was reignited when the  5.1 earthquake struck. The aftershocks of the quake continued with a heavy frequency of 3.0+ quakes throughout December and January until the end of January, with the largest aftershock being a  4.4. Magnitude 3 earthquakes continued to strike throughout the year with less frequency until it ended in the later months of 1988. On 10 March 1989, the sequence got reignited and a  5.0 struck near the first large shock, causing minor damage. In total, thousands of events with a magnitude of 0+ were recorded.

Impact 
Property damage from the 5.1 was widespread mostly near João Câmara; although in the same place minor damage was caused in the August–September 1986 events as well. More than 4,000 homes were destroyed or damaged; 500 of those were rebuilt using a typical design made by the Brazilian Army, which consists of timber panels with concrete infill. Multiple buildings other than homes made of brick or stone suffered extensive amounts of cracks. In some cases including the church of the city suffered collapsing of walls. A seriously damaged hospital and a few schools were completely rebuilt of reinforced concrete. Out of the brick buildings, buildings made of poor quality brick were mostly damaged. Cracks or wall collapses usually happened on buildings with poor mortars or sun-dried bricks with poor quality. Collapses of tiled roofs were also widespread. Newer buildings and buildings made of concrete received little to no damage.

More than 10,000 people were displaced as a result of the earthquakes, mostly in fear of landslides.

Response 
Following the earthquake, 4 vertical component short period seismometers were deployed in the area in order to locate events in a more easier way and understand the characteristics of the earthquakes.

The President of Brazil (which was José Sarney at the time) as well as several other ministers visited the area which was hit by the earthquake. Camps were also set-up for the displaced residents to be sheltered in.

See also 
 List of earthquakes in Brazil

Notes

References

Sources

External links

Natural disasters in Brazil
1986 earthquakes
1986 in Brazil
Earthquakes in Brazil